Little David Wilkins (born May 18, 1945) is an American country music singer, songwriter, and pianist. Between 1969 and 1977, he recorded for MCA Records with whom he released his greatest number of chart hits.

Wilkins performed at a nightclub in Parsons, Tennessee during the 1960s. He rose to fame as the writer of many songs that were performed by other artists; his first was Brenda Lee's 1966 hit single "Coming on Strong". Other artists who have recorded his songs include Charley Pride, Billy "Crash" Craddock, Jack Greene, Leroy Van Dyke, Stonewall Jackson, Sonny James, Ronnie Dove, Barbara Mandrell, and Percy Sledge.

He was also the inspiration behind Elvis Presley's 1975 single "T-R-O-U-B-L-E".

One of Wilkins' songs, "Georgia Keeps Pulling on My Ring", was later covered by Conway Twitty.

After his success in songwriting for other artists brought him attention, Wilkins began recording his own songs, beginning with a 1969 single "Just Blow In His Ear".

Discography

Albums

Singles

References

External links

Official Videos

1945 births
American male singer-songwriters
American country singer-songwriters
American country pianists
American male pianists
Living people
MCA Records artists
Singer-songwriters from Tennessee
People from Decatur County, Tennessee
20th-century American pianists
Country musicians from Tennessee
21st-century American pianists
20th-century American male musicians
21st-century American male musicians